NGC 6401 is a globular cluster in the constellation Ophiuchus. William Herschel discovered this star cluster in 1784 with his 47 cm telescope, but mistakenly believed it to be a bright nebula. Later his son, John Herschel, was to make the same error because the technology of the day was insufficient to allow the individual stars to be resolved visually.

External links 
 
 NGC 6401 SEDS.org (Revised NGC) 
 NGC 6401 NASA Extragalactic Database 
 Enigmatic cluster targeted by Hubble

Globular clusters
Ophiuchus (constellation)
6401